The 1977–78 season was the 98th season of competitive football by Rangers.

Overview
Rangers played a total of 53 competitive matches during the 1977–78 season. Wallace presided over the club's fourth domestic treble and second in three years. During the close season Rangers spent heavily in the transfer market, bringing in Davie Cooper from Clydebank for £100,000 and Gordon Smith from Kilmarnock for £65,000. They were joined at the club by Bobby Russell who arrived from Shettleston Juniors for free.

However, even with these expensive signings the side did not make the best start to the league campaign, losing the opening two matches to Aberdeen and Hibernian. Order was restored the following week with a 4–0 defeat of Partick Thistle. A resounding 3–2 win over Celtic in the first Old Firm match of the season set the tone of the season. Rangers had been 2-0 down at half-time but recovered to win the game after outclassing Jock Stein's side in the second 45 minutes. In March 1978, second placed Aberdeen won 3–0 at Ibrox to set up a tense title run in. Rangers dropped seven points from twenty-one but held on winning the final four fixtures and the league.

The League Cup was won by defeating Celtic 2-1 after extra time. Goals from season new boys Davie Cooper and Gordon Smith completed the first leg of the treble. The 2-1 1978 Scottish Cup Final win over Aberdeen made Wallace the first and only Rangers' manager to win two domestic treble's. Surprisingly despite this unprecedented success Wallace resign from his position on 23 May 1978.

Results
All results are written with Rangers' score first.

Scottish Premier Division

Cup Winners' Cup

Scottish Cup

League Cup

Non-competitive

Tennent Caledonian Cup

Glasgow Cup

*Rangers won the match 4–3 on penalties
✝Competition not completed

Appearances

League table

See also
 1977–78 in Scottish football
 1977–78 Scottish Cup
 1977–78 Scottish League Cup
 1977–78 European Cup Winners' Cup

References 

Rangers F.C. seasons
Scottish football championship-winning seasons
Rangers